The  is a monorail system in northern Osaka Prefecture, Japan, operated by . It links the three campuses of Osaka University.

IC cards can be used on the Osaka Monorail, including Suica, Pasmo, PiTaPa and ICOCA.

Lines

Rolling stock

Current
1000 series
2000 series
3000 series

Extension
In 2015, Osaka Prefecture announced plans to extend the monorail to Uryudo in Higashiōsaka.

See also
Monorails in Japan
List of rapid transit systems

References

External links

 

Monorails
Alweg people movers
Rail transport in Osaka Prefecture
Companies based in Osaka Prefecture
Monorails in Japan
Osaka University transportation
Japanese third-sector railway lines